The South Portland Historic District is an historic district in Portland, Oregon's South Portland neighborhood, in the United States. It was listed on the National Register of Historic Places in 1998.

Description
The 31-block area is irregular in shape, bounded by Southwest Barbur Boulevard to the west and Southwest Hood Street to the east. Southwest Meade and Arthur Streets define much of the northern boundary.

The district has 111 primary contributing, 75 secondary contributing, and 13 historic non-contributing buildings. Five buildings in the district are listed on the National Register of Historic Places: the Corkish Apartments, Milton W. Smith House, Neighborhood House, and the Peter Taylor House and Gotlieb Haehlen House. The neighborhood exhibits Queen Anne, Rural Vernacular, and Italianate architectural styles, among others.

See also

 National Register of Historic Places listings in Southwest Portland, Oregon

References

External links
 

Historic districts on the National Register of Historic Places in Oregon
Late 19th and Early 20th Century American Movements architecture
National Register of Historic Places in Portland, Oregon
Southwest Portland, Oregon
Victorian architecture in Oregon